The Mushaf of Ali is a codex of the Quran (a ) that was collected by Ali ibn Abi Talib, the cousin and son-in-law of the Islamic prophet Muhammad. Ali was one of the first scribes of the Quran. In his codex, he had likely ordered the verses of the Qur'an by their time of revelation to Muhammad. It is also reported that Ali's codex included additional information on the abrogated verses of the Qur'an. Shia sources state that, after Muhammad's death, Ali offered his codex for official use but was turned down. It is unclear whether this codex has survived though some reports suggest that it was handed down from every Shia Imam to his successor, as part of the esoteric knowledge available to them.

Historical discussion
It has been noted that Shia Imams rejected the idea that the Qur'an had been altered. According to Modarressi, in their criticism of the first three caliphs, Shia Imams never accused the latter of tampering with the text of the Qur'an. Instead they held that the caliphs and their followers had preserved the text but distorted its message. This belief in the authenticity of the text of the Qur'an, as preserved in the Uthmanic codex, is reflected in numerous narrations attributed to Shia Imams. Their only point of disagreement with the Uthmanic codex was on the arrangement of surahs 93, 94, 105, and 106. They viewed surahs 105 and 106 as a single surah as it appears in the codex of Ubayy. Similarly, they regarded surahs 93 and 94 as a single surah. The latter claim is supported by some early Muslim authorities, including Umar bin Abd al-Aziz and Tawus bin Kaysan.

References

Arabic words and phrases
Quran
Ali